"Qué más pues?" is a song by Colombian singer J Balvin and Argentine singer María Becerra. It was released on May 27, 2021, through Universal Music Group. The song surpassed 10 million streams on Spotify within days of its release and reached number 1 on the Billboard Argentina Hot 100 chart.

Background
The collaboration was announced by both artists and caused an impact among the people of Argentina as it was announced as a surprise. In an interview with Los 40 Argentina, Becerra said about the song: 

Just a few hours after its release, the song became a trend reaching the first position in several countries, the singer J Balvin launched the #QueMasPuesChallengue that went viral on TikTok.

Music video
The music video was released the same day the single was released through J Balvin's channel. The video reached 5 million visits in just a few hours, reaching 1 in trends in Argentina, Spain, Colombia, among other countries. The video was directed by José Emilio Sagar and currently exceeds 20 million visits.

Commercial performance
The song debuted at number 4 on the Billboard Argentina Hot 100 chart. After a few weeks on the chart the song reached number 1. The song also reached the top 3 in Spain and the top 10 in Colombia. The song reached the top 20 on the Billboard charts, peaked at number 18 on the Billboard Global 200 chart. It also reached number 16 on the Hot Latin Songs chart. 

Just a month after its release, the song was certified a gold record in Argentina equivalent to 10,000 units, the platinum record in Spain for 40,000 units. Within a year of its release, The single certified a diamond record and fourth platinum records in Mexico equivalent to 1,260,000 units, making Becerra the first Argentine artist to have a diamond record in Mexico and the best selling female Argentine singer in Mexico.

Charts

Weekly charts

Year-end charts

Certifications

References

External links
 Lyrics of this song at Genius

2021 singles
2021 songs
Argentina Hot 100 number-one singles
J Balvin songs
Male–female vocal duets
María Becerra songs
Reggaeton songs
Songs written by J Balvin
Spanish-language songs
Universal Music Group singles